The 1950 Australian Championships was a tennis tournament that took place on outdoor Grass courts at the Kooyong Stadium in Melbourne, Australia from 21 January to 30 January. It was the 38th edition of the Australian Championships (now known as the Australian Open), the 11th held in Melbourne, and the first Grand Slam tournament of the year. Australian Frank Sedgman and American Louise Brough Clapp won the singles titles.

Finals

Men's singles

 Frank Sedgman defeated  Ken McGregor  6–3, 6–4, 4–6, 6–1

Women's singles

 Louise Brough defeated  Doris Hart  6–4, 3–6, 6–4

Men's doubles
 John Bromwich /  Adrian Quist defeated  Jaroslav Drobný /  Eric Sturgess 6–3, 5–7, 4–6, 6–3, 8–6

Women's doubles
 Louise Brough /  Doris Hart defeated  Nancye Wynne Bolton /  Thelma Coyne Long 6–2, 2–6, 6–3

Mixed doubles
 Doris Hart /  Frank Sedgman defeated  Joyce Fitch /  Eric Sturgess 8–6, 6–4

References

External links
 Australian Open official website

1950 in tennis
1950
1950 in Australian tennis
January 1950 sports events in Australia